Compact surveillance radar are small lightweight radar systems that have a wide coverage area and are able to track people and vehicles in range and azimuth angle. They weigh less than 10 pounds, consume less than 15 Watts of power and are easily deployed in large numbers.  

Compact surveillance radar have the same characteristics of the larger Ground Surveillance Radar (GSR) namely; the ability to track many moving targets simultaneously, all weather day & night operation, wide coverage areas and the ability to track targets and cue cameras automatically.

References

Radar